The economy of Seychelles is based on fishing, tourism, processing of coconuts and vanilla, coir (coconut fiber) rope, boat building, printing, furniture and beverages. Agricultural products include cinnamon, sweet potatoes, cassava (tapioca), bananas, poultry and tuna.

The public sector, comprising the government and state-owned enterprises, dominates the economy in terms of employment and gross revenue, employing two-thirds of the labor force. Government consumption absorbs over one-third of Seychelles's GDP.

Economic history 

The French originally settled the Seychelles in 1770, setting up plantations which relied heavily on slave labour to produce cotton, sugar, rice, and maize. The British took control of the Seychelles during the Napoleonic Wars without removing the French upper class.

After the British prohibited slavery in 1835, the influx of African workers did not end because British warships captured Arab slavers and forced the liberated slaves to work on plantations as apprentices without pay.

In the 1960s, about 33% of the working population worked at plantations, and 20% worked in the public or government sector.

Advent of the tourist industry (1971) 

Plantations were the main industry of the Seychelles until 1971, when the international airport opened. Overnight, tourism became a serious industry, basically dividing the economy into plantations and tourism. The tourism sector paid better, and the plantation economy could only expand so far.

The plantation sector of the economy declined in prominence, and tourism and fishing became the primary industries of Seychelles. In the 1960s, about 33% of the working population worked at plantations, but by 2006 it was less than 3%.

While the tourism and industrial fishing industries were on a roll in the late 1990s, the traditional plantation economy atrophied. Cinnamon barks and copra—traditional export crops—dwindled to negligible amounts by 1991. There were no exports of copra in 1996; 318 tons of cinnamon bark was exported in 1996, reflecting a decrease of 35% in cinnamon bark exports from 1995.

The US military Indian Ocean Tracking Station on Mahé operated from 1963 until 1996.

Current economy 

Since Seychelles' independence in 1976, per capita output has expanded to roughly seven times the old near-subsistence level. Growth has been led by the tourist sector, which employs about 30% of the labor force and provides more than 70% of hard currency earnings, followed by tuna fishing.  In recent years the government has encouraged foreign investment in order to upgrade hotels and other services.

At the same time, the government has moved to reduce the dependence on tourism by promoting the development of farming, fishing, small-scale manufacturing and most recently the offshore sector. The vulnerability of the tourist sector was illustrated by the sharp drop in 1991-92 due largely to the Gulf War. Although the industry has rebounded, the government recognizes the continuing need for upgrading the sector in the face of stiff international competition. Other issues facing the government are the curbing of the budget deficit and further privatization of public enterprises.

Despite attempts to improve its agricultural base and emphasize locally manufactured products and indigenous materials, Seychelles imports 90% of the food it consumes. The exceptions are some fruits and vegetables, fish, poultry, pork, beer, cigarettes, paint, and a few locally made plastic items. Imports of all kind are controlled by the Seychelles Marketing Board (SMB), a government parastatal which operates all the major supermarkets and is the distributor and licensor of most other imports.

In an effort to increase agricultural self-sufficiency, Seychelles has undertaken steps to make the sector more productive and to provide incentives to farmers. Much of the state holdings in the agricultural sector have been privatized, while the role of the government has been reduced to conducting research and providing infrastructure.

In 2020, the Corruption Perception Index from Transparency International assessed Seychelles as the least corrupt country in Africa.

Tourism and fishing

Tourism is one of the most important sectors of the economy, accounting for approximately 16.6% (2000) of GDP. Employment, foreign earnings, construction, banking, and commerce are all dominated by tourism-related industries. Tourism earned $631 million in 1999–2000. About 130,046 tourists visited Seychelles in 2000, 80.1% of them from Europe (United Kingdom, Italy, France, Germany, and Switzerland).

In 2000, industrial fishing surpassed tourism as the most important foreign exchange earner. Manufacturing, construction, and industrial fishing, notably tuna fishing, account for about 28.8% of the GDP. Earnings are growing annually from licensing fees paid by foreign trawlers fishing in Seychelles' territorial waters.

In 1995, Seychelles saw the privatization of the Seychelles Tuna Canning Factory, 60% of which was purchased by the American food company Heinz. Similarly, some port operations have been privatized, a trend that has been accompanied by a fall in transshipment fees and an increase in efficiency. Overall, this has sparked a recovery in port services following a drastic fall in 2009.

Manufacturing 
Many of the other industrial activities are limited to small scale manufacturing, particularly agro-processing and import substitution. Agriculture (including artisanal and forestry), once the backbone of the economy, now accounts for around 3% of the GDP.

Public sector 
The public sector, comprising the government and state-owned enterprises, dominates the economy in terms of employment and gross revenue, employing two-thirds of the labor force. Public consumption absorbs over one-third of the GDP.

Vulnerability to external shocks
The Seychelles economy is extremely vulnerable to external shocks. Not only does it depend on tourism, but it imports over 90% of its total primary and secondary production inputs. Any decline in tourism quickly translates into a fall in GDP, a decline in foreign exchange receipts, and budgetary difficulties.

Economic growth
Growth slowed in 1998–2001, due to sluggish tourist and tuna sectors. Also, tight controls on exchange rates and the scarcity of foreign exchange have impaired short-term economic prospects. The black market value of the Seychellois rupee is anywhere from two thirds to one half the official exchange rate. The next few years were also slow due to the worldwide economic downturn and the fear of flying brought on by the terrorism on September 11, 2001.

More recently though, tourism has roared back at a record pace setting successive records in 2006 and again in 2007 for number of visitors. The increased availability of flights to and from the archipelago due in part to new entrants Emirates and Qatar airlines is also beginning to show. New five star properties and the devaluation of the currency by nearly 33% by the Seychelles Government is having a positive influence on the tourism sector as well.   Both at official exchange rates and at purchasing power parity (PPP), Seychelles remains the richest territory in Africa in terms of GDP per capita (US$9,440.095 at real exchange rates and US$17,560.062 at PPP 2008 estimate),

Because of economic contraction (the economy declined by about 2% in 2004 and 2005 and lost another 1.4% in 2006 according to the International Monetary Fund) the country was moving downwards in terms of per capita income.  However, the economy bounced back in 2007, growing by 5.3% due in part to record tourism numbers and the booming building and offshore industries. The IMF forecast further growth in 2008 with continuing increase in the GDP per capita.

In October 2008, as tourism and fishing revenue began slowing, the Seychelles defaulted on a $230 million debt. The International Monetary Fund stepped with a two-year, $26 million rescue package. The rescue package came with a few stipulations; The country laid off 1,800 government workers, floated its currency, lifted foreign exchange controls and sold off state assets. At the time, the country's $800 million external foreign debt was equivalent to almost 175 percent of its gross domestic product.

The decision to let the currency trade freely as part of the IMF rescue package means that Seychelles is the smallest country in the world that has a completely independent currency - one that is neither pegged, nor an adopted foreign currency, nor a common currency used within a larger monetary union.  When the Seychellois rupee became freely floated on November 3, 2008, its value quickly fell drastically, decreasing from eight per U.S. dollar to 16, effectively doubled the prices of imports.

The global recession and piracy in the Indian Ocean hit Seychelles hard in 2009, with the GDP projected to contract by 7.5 percent. However the government exceeded its fiscal targets, with a primary surplus of 13.4% of GDP in the first nine months of 2009 according to the IMF. They report expenditure has been tightly controlled and revenue has held up well despite the difficult economic environment.

In May 2010 an International Monetary Fund mission visited Seychelles and concluded the country is making progress. The head of the mission, Mr. Jean Le Dem, said at the conclusion of the visit:The economy is recovering from a recession that put real gross domestic product (GDP) to almost a stand in 2009. Real GDP is projected to grow at 4 percent in 2010, reflecting primarily a rebound in tourism earnings. Twelve-month inflation, which was negative during the past few months, is expected to return to about 1 percent by year-end

In 2017 the Seychelles joined the World Trade Organisation, facilitated by Omani economist Hilda al-Hinai, who chaired the Working Group.

Financial Services
In addition to the now booming tourism and building/real estate markets, Seychelles has renewed its commitment to developing its financial services sector.  Government officials and industry participants believe this could overtake the tourism industry as the chief pillar of the economy by 2017.  The recent passage of a revised Mutual Fund Act 2007, Securities Act 2007 and Insurance Act 2007 are meant to be the catalysts to move Seychelles from just another offshore jurisdiction to a full-fledged Offshore Financial Center (OFC).

The Ministry of Finance is responsible for economic decisions and budgetary policy. A separate Monetary Authority supervises the banking system and manages the money supply. Although foreign banks operate branches in Seychelles, the government owns the two local banks—the Development Bank of Seychelles, which mobilizes resources to fund development programs, and the Seychelles Saving Bank, a bank for savings and current accounts.

The Seychelles International Business Authority (SIBA) is charged with overseeing the quickly growing offshore industry.

Offshore oil and gas
New detailed studies and exploration shows that the Seychelles potentially have large off-shore petroleum reservoirs which are yet to be discovered. Drills have proven the presence of:

 Oil-prone source rocks containing Type II kerogen in coaly deltaic shales of the Middle Jurassic and in marine shales of the Upper Jurassic;
 Mixed source rocks bearing Type II/III kerogen in deltaic marine shales of the Lower Cretaceous that are II correlative of oil-generating shales in Somalia;
 Gas-prone sources containing Type I kerogen in Upper Triassic fluvial shales and Paleocene marine shales, the latter being correlative of oil and gas generating source rocks of the Deep Continental Shelf trend of the Bombay High Oil Province offshore west India;
 Evidence of hydrocarbon generation and migration with well shows, such as 0.7 ml benzene in DST-1 of Reith Bank-1, 10,010 ppm of 99.8% n-C4 headspace gas coincident with as small fault in the same well and 20% petrol vapours at an immature level of volcanics in Owen Bank A-1;
 Clastic reservoirs with measured porosities up to 22% in the Early-Middle Jurassic;
 Sealing lithologies occur both locally in syn-rift, and regionally in post-rift sequences;
 An extensive seismic dataset, plus a variety of remote sensing data have been collected which bolster the well data by confirming the presence of:
 A variety of trapping styles, dominated by tilted fault blocks, stratigraphic pinchouts and reefs;
 Multiple heating events, with the principal event post-dating trap formation; and
 Hydrocarbon generation and migration with the presence of: a) numerous DHIs on seismic, including gas chimneys, flat spots, bright spots, phase changes and chemosynthetic reefs; b) gas sniffer anomalies, involving ethane/iso-butane in the southeast and propane/normal butane/total hydrocarbon in the north and northeast; c) UV fluorescence anomalies, especially over the wells and in the southeast; and d) 4 types of beach-stranded tar that correlate to the local source rock stratigraphy.

However, to date all exploratory and stratigraphic test wells (a total of 9 since the 1970s) in the Seychelles have failed to find commercial hydrocarbons.  The most recent wildcat by Enterprise Oil in 1995 detected gas but failed to find hydrocarbons.

Several oil and gas exploration companies are active in the Seychelles offshore. These include East African Exploration (EAX) (a subsidiary of Afren), Avana Petroleum (a subsidiary of Vanoil Energy) and WHL Energy.

Beginning at the turn of the millennium the Seychelles Petroleum Company (SEPEC) started to develop the first fleet of modern petroleum double-hull tankers, with five vessels, which was completed by late 2007/early 2008 with the possibility to build more in the near future. The Seychelles President claims that this has opened the door to a new industry for his country and encouraged economic growth by further removing over-reliance on traditional trades like fisheries and tourism, which is now falling rapidly as the country's main income but nevertheless, has experienced significant growth in recent years.

The country has also increased its capacity for wind power, with windfarms on Romainville Island.

Economic statistics

GDP: 
official exchange rate - $1.498 billion (2017) 
purchasing power parity - $2.75 billion (2017)

GDP - real growth rate: 
+5.3% (2017 est.)
0.8% (2016)

GDP - per capita: 
purchasing power parity - $29,300 (2017)

GDP - composition by sector:
agriculture:
2.5% (2017 est.)
industry:
13.8% (2017 est.)
services:
83.7% (2017 est.)

Inflation rate (consumer prices): 
2.9% (2017 est.)

-1% (2016 est.)

Labor force: 
47,210 (2017 est.)

Labor force - by occupation: 
services: 74%, industry: 23%, agriculture: 3% (2006)

Unemployment rate: 
3% (2017 est.)

Budget: 
revenues: $593.4 million (2017 est.)
expenditures: $600.7 million (2017 est.)

Industries:
fishing, tourism, processing of coconuts and vanilla, coir (coconut fiber) rope, boat building, printing, furniture; beverages

Industrial production growth rate: 
2.3% (2017 est.)

Agriculture - products:
coconuts, cinnamon, vanilla, sweet potatoes, cassava (tapioca), bananas; poultry; tuna

Exports: 
$564.8 million (2017 est.)

Exports - commodities:
canned tuna, frozen fish, petroleum products (re-exports)

, the main export products are processed fish (60%) and non-fillet frozen fish (22%).

Exports - partners:
UAE 28.5%, France 24%, UK 13.5%, Italy 8.9%, Germany 4.6% (2017) 
UK 27.6%, France 15.8%, Spain 12.7%, Japan 8.6%, Italy 7.5%, Germany 5.6% (2004)

Imports:
$1.155 billion (2017 est.) 
$991 million (2016 est.)

Imports - commodities:
machinery and equipment, foodstuffs, petroleum products, chemicals, other manufactured goods

Imports - partners:
UAE 13.4%, France 9.4%, Spain 5.7%, South Africa 5% (2017)

Debt - external:
$2.559 billion (31 December 2017 est.)
$2.651 billion (31 December 2016 est,)

Currency:
1 Seychelles rupee (SCR or SRe) = 100 cents

Exchange rates:
Seychelles rupees (SCR) per US$1 − 13.64 (2017), 13.319 (2015), 12.747 (2013), 11.85 (May 2010), 16.7 (February 2009), 8.0 (2008), 5.8 (2007), 5.5 (2006), 5.3 (1999), 4.7 (1995)

Seychelles rupees (SCR) per Pound Sterling £1 − 17.50 (May 2010), 24.11 (February 2009)

Seychelles rupees (SCR) per Euro €1 − 15.04 (May 2010), 21.55 (February 2009)

Fiscal year:
calendar year

See also
Seychelles
Seychelles Port Authority
 United Nations Economic Commission for Africa

References

External links

Seychelles latest trade data on ITC Trade Map
Seychelles economy

 
Seychelles